The Indonesian Democratic Vanguard Party was a political party in Indonesia. It was a continuation of the Indonesian Democratic Party (PDI), one of the two state-approved parties during the New Order. After the PDI failed to achieve enough votes in the 1999 legislative elections to qualify for the 2004 elections, it changed its name to the Indonesian Democratic Vanguard Party (PDI Party). In 2004 it won one seat. The party contested the 2009 legislative election, but won only 0.13 percent of the vote, less than the 2.5 percent electoral threshold, thereby losing its only seat in the People's Representative Council. Following its poor result in the 2009 vote, the party joined nine other smaller parties to form the National Unity Party. The party also attempted to contest the 2014 elections, but failed to fulfill the criteria set by the General Elections Commission, and along with nine other parties who also failed to qualify, decided to merge into the People's Conscience Party (Hanura).

References

Political parties in Indonesia
Political parties established in 2003
2003 establishments in Indonesia
Pancasila political parties